Will Aitken is an American-Canadian novelist, journalist and film critic. Originally from Terre Haute, Indiana, he has been based in Montreal, Quebec since moving to that city to attend McGill University in 1972.

In Montreal, he was a cofounder of the city's first LGBT bookstore, Librairie L'Androgyne, in 1973. He has also worked as an arts journalist and film critic for a variety of media outlets, including the CBC, the BBC, National Public Radio, The Globe and Mail, Maclean's, The Paris Review, Christopher Street and the National Post.

He published his first novel, Terre Haute, in 1989. He has since published two further novels.

He taught film studies at Dawson College in Montreal. In 2011, he published Death in Venice: A Queer Film Classic, a critical analysis of Luchino Visconti's 1971 film Death in Venice, as part of Arsenal Pulp Press's Queer Film Classics series.

His 2018 book, Antigone Undone: Juliette Binoche, Anne Carson, Ivo Van Hove and the Art of Resistance, was published by University of Regina Press. The book was a shortlisted finalist for the 2018 Hilary Weston Writers' Trust Prize for Nonfiction.

Works

Novels
Terre Haute. 1989, .
A Visit Home. 1993, .
Realia. 2000, .
The Swells. 2021, .

Non-fiction
Death in Venice: A Queer Film Classic. 2011, .
Antigone Undone: Juliette Binoche, Anne Carson, Ivo Van Hove, and the Art of Resistance. 2018, .

Anthologies
Madder Love: Queer Men and the Precincts of Surrealism (ed. Peter Dubé). 2008.

References

20th-century American novelists
20th-century Canadian male writers
21st-century American novelists
American male novelists
American male journalists
American film critics
Canadian male novelists
Canadian film critics
Canadian gay writers
American LGBT novelists
Writers from Montreal
Academic staff of Dawson College
Writers from Terre Haute, Indiana
Living people
McGill University alumni
20th-century Canadian novelists
21st-century Canadian novelists
Canadian LGBT novelists
21st-century Canadian male writers
Novelists from Indiana
21st-century Canadian non-fiction writers
20th-century American essayists
21st-century American essayists
Canadian male non-fiction writers
Year of birth missing (living people)
20th-century American male writers
21st-century American male writers
American gay writers
Gay novelists
21st-century Canadian LGBT people
20th-century Canadian LGBT people